You Can't Spell Slaughter Without Laughter is the debut full-length studio album by American experimental rock band I Set My Friends on Fire, released on October 7, 2008 via Epitaph Records. It includes the band's most famous song, "Things That Rhyme With Orange", a promotional video for which was released July 22, 2009. Four of the album's tracks are re-released songs from the band's self-released EP I Set My Friends On Fire EP. The album reached #29 on the Billboard Top Heatseekers chart.

Track listing

Reception

You Can't Spell Slaughter Without Laughter was panned by most music critics. The album received a 0.5 rating out of five from Slant reviewer Nate Adams, who said "[It's] high in the running for worst album of the year ... The music aims for brutality and melody, but misses the mark entirely on both counts." Alternative Press reviewer Phil Freeman also gave the album a half star out of five, remarking that the album "truly fails because it has exactly zero memorable moments".

In a mixed review, John Lucas of the Georgia Straight said that the album "seems designed to test the listener’s tolerance", but that "those willing to embrace a noisy, ambitious, self-indulgent, and downright weird record will find a lot to love". Logan Broger of ChartAttack gave it three stars out of five, saying, "When the grind-electro-hardcore-pop duo aren't being obnoxious or comedic, there are some tunes that are actually really, really brilliant." Also giving it a three out of five, Sputnikmusic reviewer Brent Stephenson said, "The album is really just meant to be as obscenely ridiculous as it possibly can, and in that regard it is quite successful."

Personnel
You Can't Spell Slaughter Without Laughter  album personnel as listed on Allmusic.
I Set My Friends On Fire
Matt Mehana – lead vocals, lyrics	
Nabil Moo – programming, guitars, bass, keyboards, synthesizers, drums, percussion, composer, arrangements, vocals

 Additional musicians
DeAndre Way – lyrics, composer

 Production
Travis Richter – production
Nabil Moo – production
Jeff Abarta – production, management
Lee Dyess – engineering, mixing
Ted Jensen – mastering
Kamal Moo – management
Sally Koening – legal
Brett Gurewitz – artist and repertoire
Nick Pritchard – artwork, design

References	

2008 debut albums
Epitaph Records albums
I Set My Friends on Fire albums